Wuxi County is a county of Chongqing Municipality, People's Republic of China, bordering Shaanxi to the north and Hubei to the northeast and east. Sitting at the upper reaches of Daning River and the southern slopes of the central Daba Mountains.  It is best known for its scenic views and its preserved witchcraft culture.

Wuxi County is noted as a major tourism site of Chongqing.

Administrative divisions 
Wuxi County has 2 subdistricts and numerous towns and townships:

Former township:
 Zhonggang

Geography 

The vast majority of Wuxi's land area is mountainous. With a wet abundant precipitation, Wuxi County is suitable for many plants to grow, the local products are medicine nectar, starch, bacon, dried fruit, vegetables and antler.

Climate

Economy 
Total economy performance in 2013 is good and growth rate is accelerating. Total GDP is 9.01 billion yuan in 2013.

Farming in Wuxi County
Major products include rice, corn, potato, sweet potato, cotton, broccoli, cauliflower, spinach, carrot and soybean.

Wuxi Industry Park 
Manufacturing is the most important economy sector of Wuxi County, they are separately located in several industrial park of Wuxi county.
One industry park is in Fenghuang town(凤凰), another one is in Jianshan Town(尖山), the third industrial park is in Ninggang. They all are regulated by Wuxi Government.

Banking in Wuxi County 
Agricultural Bank of China is the most popular bank in Wuxi County with Postal Savings Bank of China come to the second place under the regulation of People's Bank of China of Wuxi County

Mining in Wuxi County 
Mining is still an important part of the economy of Wuxi County, The major areas of production in 2010 were coal, iron ore, natural gas, salt and zinc.

Tourism

Tourism is a large industry in Wuxi county, with a number of tourism companies flourishing in recent years. The county's natural resources are some of the best preserved in Chongqing.
Wuxi New Burg
Wuxi Cave
Wuxi Prairie
Yuntai Temple
Ning Town
Daning Town of Yore
Chinese New Year at Wuxi
Daning River

Transportation

Massive infrastructure programs started in 2008, like Wuxi-Yunyan highway, Wuxi-Fengjie highway and Wuxi-Zhenping highway with anticipation of completion in 2013 and that will be connected with other China National Highways

There is also a plan under consideration about building an airport in Wuxi County to serve the region across Shaanxi province, Sichuan province also other neighbouring provinces like Hubei, Guizhou, Hunan.

The Wuxi Long-distance Bus Station started bus service to Guangdong province and Shanghai in early 2009 while  Wuxi Zhaojiaba Bus Station serves domestic transportation.

Wuxi Long-distance Bus Station
Wuxi Zhaojiaba Bus Station
Port of Wuxi

Education

Elementary schools 
Chengxiang Elementary School
Huancheng Elementary School
Zhuhai Experiment Elementary School

Middle and High Schools 
Wuxi Middle School
Chenxiang Middle School
Wuxi GuLu Middle School()
Shanghuang Middle School()

Vocational Schools 
Huancheng Vocational School
Wenfeng Vocational School

References

External links
The official website of the government of Wuxi
 BBC, White Horse Village - changing China
Wuxi English Forum

 
County-level divisions of Chongqing